Wang Qingfen (born 27 March 1973) is a retired Chinese middle-distance runner who specialized in the 1500 metres.

Her personal best time was 3:58.97 minutes, achieved in October 1997 in Shanghai.

International competitions

References

1973 births
Living people
Chinese female middle-distance runners
Asian Games silver medalists for China
Asian Games medalists in athletics (track and field)
Athletes (track and field) at the 1998 Asian Games
Medalists at the 1998 Asian Games